Ammu Swaminathan or A. V. Ammakuti (22 April 1894 – 4 July 1978) was an Indian social worker and political activist during the Indian independence movement and a member of the Constituent Assembly of India.

Early life
Ammukutty Swaminadhan was born into the Vadakkath family of Anakkara in Ponnani taluk, Kerala. Her father, Govinda Menon, was a minor local official. Both of Ammu's parents belonged to the Nair caste, and she was the youngest of their thirteen children, which included nine daughters. Ammu never went to school and received only a rudimentary education at home, which consisted of minimal reading and writing in Malayalam, cooking and keeping house, to prepare her for married life. She lost her father at a very young age, and her mother struggled to raise her children and arrange marriages for her many daughters. Resultantly, when Ammu was 13, her mother arranged an alliance for her which conformed to the Sambandam system which was well accepted in Kerala society at that time. Her spouse was Subbarama Swaminathan, an Kerala Iyer Brahmin who was more than twenty years older than Ammu.

Married life
Subbarama Swaminathan, born into a middle-class  Kerala Iyer family, had struggled hard in his early life to gain an education and rise above his situation. He had studied with scholarships at the universities of Edinburgh and London. His extended stay abroad and financial situation had prevented him from marrying until he was in his mid-30s. The arrival of the very young and sheltered Ammu fulfilled deep emotional needs for Subbarama and he devoted a large part of his life to nurturing her development in every way. Indeed, he formally married Ammu at a registry office in London at a later point. This was necessary because Sambandam relationships, while traditionally acknowledged, did not constitute marriage and the children of such a union belonged only to the family of their mother and not their father. Even the registered marriage in London did not change people's attitudes, or the way the family was received in society: both of Ammu's daughters were to recount in their memoirs that while their father's family acknowledged them (as was traditional) by including them at family events such as weddings, they would be served their food separately from other family members, and subtle distinctions would be evident in the way they were treated.

The legally valid wedding in the London registry office did have one definite result: the abandonment of the matrilineal Marumakkathayam system and the severance of affiliation with the Vadakkath family and the matrilineal Nair community to which Ammu and her parents had belonged. Henceforth, she and her children would be known by the name of their husband/father. Thus, the family came to be known by the name Swaminathan.

Career

Ammu's life was transformed and blossomed under the tutelage of her husband. Subbarama Swaminathan both indulged and nurtured his much younger wife and encouraged her talents. He appointed tutors to teach her English and other subjects at home, and thus rectify to the extent possible the fact that she was uneducated. She soon became fluent in English, and the confidence which her husband's support gave her meant that she also developed a forceful and willful personality. Indeed she later came to dominate her husband thoroughly, because she was much younger and better-looking than him, and because she had a forceful personality. It was under her husband's influence that Ammu became a follower of Mahatma Gandhi and took part in India's struggle for independence. After independence, she served as a member of the Constituent Assembly of India.

In 1952, Ammu Swaminadhan was elected a member of the Rajya Sabha from Madras State. She was associated with several cultural and social organizations, and served as President of the Bharat Scouts and Guides from November 1960 to March 1965. She was also selected as 'Mother of The Year' in 1975 on the inauguration of International Women's Year.

Children and family
Ammu Swaminathan had four children:
 Govind Swaminadhan, the elder son, a barrister at the Madras High Court. He served as the Advocate-General of Tamil Nadu from 1969 to 1976.
Captain Lakshmi Swaminadhan (1914-2012) was a medical doctor, a revolutionary of the Indian independence movement and an officer of the Indian National Army. She was a member of Rajya Sabha and was nominated as a presidential candidate in 2002.
Mrinalini Sarabhai, a Bharatanatyam dancer and wife of Vikram Sarabhai, a renowned scientist. They are the parents of Mallika Sarabhai, a dancer and former Gujarati film actress.
Subbaram, the younger son, was a director at Mahindra and Mahindras.

References

1894 births
1978 deaths
Scouting and Guiding in India
Malayali people
India MPs 1952–1957
Lok Sabha members from Tamil Nadu
Members of the Constituent Assembly of India
People from Palakkad district
People from Dindigul district